A factory is an industrial site where goods are manufactured or processed.

Factory or The Factory may also refer to:

Arts, entertainment and media

Film and television
 The Factory (2012 film), an American crime thriller 
 The Butchers (2014 film), also known as The Factory, a horror film
 The Factory (2018 film), a Russian thriller
 Factory (TV series), a 2008 American comedy series
 The Factory (Australian TV series), 1987–1989
 Factory (Code Lyoko), a fictional location in the French animated series Code Lyoko

Music
 Factory (band), a Swedish band 1978–1982
 The Factory, a predecessor to the American band Paramore
 The Factory, a 1960s band featuring Lowell George
 Factory Records, a British record label 1978–1992

Albums
 The Factory (album), a 1999 album by Seven Nations
 Factory, a 2014 album by Buckethead
 Factory, a 1979 album by Factory (band)

Songs
 "Factory" (Band of Horses song)
 "The Factory" (song), a song recorded by Kenny Rogers in 1988
 "Factory", a song by The Vines, from the 2002 album Highly Evolved
 "Factory", a song by Bruce Springsteen, from the 1978 album Darkness on the Edge of Town
 "Factory", a song by Simple Minds, from the 1979 album Real to Real Cacophony
 "Factory", a song by Wall of Voodoo, from the album Call of the West
 "The Factory", a song by Warren Zevon, from the 1987 album Sentimental Hygiene

Literature
 The Factory (novel), a novel by Japanese author Hiroko Oyamada

Arts organisations and venues
 The Factory, Andy Warhol's New York City studio 1963–1968
 The Factory (Manchester), a future arts venue
 The Factory (music venue), a music venue in Manchester, England
 The Factory Theatre Company, an English theatre company

Other uses
 Factory (object-oriented programming), an object for creating other objects
 Factory (trading post), a medieval and early modern era transshipment point
 Factory, a development code base for openSUSE software

See also
 
 
 Factory Butte (disambiguation), two summits in Utah, US
 Factory system, the method of manufacturing using factories